Phasiatala is a village in Kalkini Upazila, Madaripur District, Bangladesh, located 350 km south west of the capital Dhaka.

See also
 List of villages in Bangladesh

References

Populated places in Dhaka Division
Villages in Madaripur District
Villages in Dhaka Division